Jamal Ahmad (also Romanized as Jamāl Aḩmad and Jammāl Ahmad; also known as Jamāl Aḩmad-e Bālā, Khoon Sorkh, Khūn-e-Sorkh, Khūn Sorkh, Khūn Surkh, and Kūnsoīkh Jamāl Aḩmad-e Bālā) is a village in Gachin Rural District, in the Central District of Bandar Abbas County, Hormozgan Province, Iran. At the 2006 census, its population was 956, in 251 families.

References 

Populated places in Bandar Abbas County